Jelle Mannaerts (born 14 October 1991 in Lommel) is a Belgian cyclist, who currently rides for Belgian amateur team Hubo–Titan Cargo.

Major results

2014
 7th Handzame Classic
2015
 6th Nationale Sluitingsprijs
2016
 9th Handzame Classic
2017
 2nd De Kustpijl
 6th Nationale Sluitingsprijs
 9th Handzame Classic
 9th Omloop van het Houtland
2018
 3rd Tro-Bro Léon
2019
 7th Overall Tour de Normandie

References

External links

1991 births
Living people
Belgian male cyclists
People from Lommel
Cyclists from Limburg (Belgium)
21st-century Belgian people